is a Japanese voice actor from Ōita, Japan.

Voice roles
Ai Yori Aoshi as Takashi
Dōjin Work as Junichirō Hoshi
Gift ~eternal rainbow~ as Masaki 'Maki' Edo
Lamento: Beyond the Void as Konoe
Mouse as SAT Agent (Ep 4)
Nyanbo! as Blaze

Dubbing
Takers, Eddie "Hatch" Hatcher (Jay Hernandez)
Veteran, Detective Yoon (Kim Shi-hoo)

References

External links
Kazutoshi Hatano's profile at Kaleidoscope 

1979 births
Japanese male voice actors
Male voice actors from Ōita Prefecture
Living people